The 2015 Brisbane Broncos season was the 28th in the club's history. Coached again for the first time since 2008 by returning foundation coach, Wayne Bennett, and captained by Justin Hodges, they competed in the NRL's 2015 Telstra Premiership. The Broncos finished the regular season in 2nd place to make the play-offs, going on to reach the 2015 NRL Grand final in which they were defeated by the North Queensland Cowboys.

Season summary

Milestones 
 Round 1: Adam Blair, James Gavet and Anthony Milford made their debuts for the club.
 Round 1: Corey Parker played his 300th career game.
 Round 2: Kodi Nikorima and Joe Ofahengaue made their first grade debuts.
 Round 2: Andrew McCullough played his 150th career game.
 Round 4: Jarrod Wallace scored his 1st career try.
 Round 5: Mitch Garbutt made his debut for the club.
 Round 7: Alex Glenn played his 150th career game and Jack Reed his 100th career game.
 Round 7: Daniel Vidot scored his 50th career try.
 Round 8: Anthony Milford played his 50th career game.
 Round 8: Corey Parker kicked his 500th career goal.
 Round 9: Lachlan Maranta played his 50th career game.
 Round 10: Adam Blair played his 200th career game.
 Round 11: Joe Boyce made his first grade debut.
 Round 12: Matt Parcell made his first grade debut.
 Round 20: Kodi Nikorima scored his 1st career try.
 Grand Final: Justin Hodges played his final career game.
 Grand Final: Brisbane Broncos lose their first grand final.

Squad List

Squad Movement

Gains

Losses

Re-signings

Contract lengths

Ladder

Fixtures

Pre-season

NRL Auckland Nines 

The NRL Auckland Nines is a pre-season rugby league nines competition featuring all 16 NRL clubs. The 2015 competition was played over two days on 31 January and 1 February at Eden Park. The Broncos feature in the Piha pool and played the Bulldogs, Sharks and Roosters.

Regular season

Finals

Statistics 

Source:

Representatives 

The following players have played a representative match in 2015.

Honours

Club 
 Paul Morgan Medal: Corey Parker
 Clubman of the Year: Justin Hodges
 Rookie of the Year: Kodi Nikorima
 Best Back: Ben Hunt
 Best Forward: Sam Thaiday
 Most Consistent: Andrew McCullough

References 

Brisbane Broncos seasons
Brisbane Broncos season